Lady with a Sword (or Feng Fei Fei) is a 1971 Shaw Brothers–produced movie starring Lily Ho and helmed by actress Kao Pao-shu in her directorial debut. 

The Chinese martial arts drama stars Ho as a young woman bent on revenge after her eldest sister is murdered. Ho's character soon finds out that her own fiancé (played by Nan-Kung Hsun, aka James Nam) is involved with the crime. His parents pressure her to forgive him, but she ultimately exacts bloody retribution. 

The film was presented in U.S. theaters during the spring of 1972 with English subtitles rather than dubbing.

References

1971 films
Shaw Brothers Studio films
1970s Hong Kong films